Toxic is a Burmese thriller horror television series. It aired on Canal+ Zat Lenn, on every Thursday at 20:00. Its season 1 aired from May 3 to July 19, 2018 for 12 episodes and season 2 aired from January 31 to April 18, 2019 for 12 episodes.

Cast
Kyaw Hsu as Eant Maw
Mone as Poe Ei Thway
Min Oo as U Nay Phone Naing
Moht Moht Myint Aung as Daw Yee Yee Myint
Mya Hnin Yee Lwin as Ruby Khin
Thi Ha as Ye Phone Khaung
Sithu Win as Ja Wah
May Mi Ko Ko as Yain
Min Phone Myat as Min Aung Myin

References

Burmese television series